5-(2-Aminopropyl)-2,3-dihydro-1H-indene (5-APDI), also known as indanylaminopropane (IAP), IAP (psychedelic), 2-API(2-aminopropylindane), indanametamine, and, incorrectly, as indanylamphetamine, is an entactogen and psychedelic drug of the amphetamine family. It has been sold by online vendors through the Internet and has been encountered as a designer drug since 2003, but its popularity and availability has diminished in recent years.

5-APDI acts as a potent and weakly selective serotonin releasing agent (SSRA) with IC50 values of 82 nM, 1,848 nM, and 849 nM for inhibiting the reuptake of serotonin, dopamine, and norepinephrine, respectively. It fully substitutes for MBDB but not amphetamine in trained animals, though it does produce disruption for the latter at high doses.

5-APDI has been classified as a class B drug under the Misuse of Drugs Act 1971 since 10 June 2014.

See also
 DiFMDA
 5-MAPDI
 6-APT

References

External links 
 The Vaults of Erowid - Indanylaminopropane
 MadMax - Illustrated Synthesis of Indanylaminopropane

Entactogens and empathogens
Indanes
Designer drugs
Serotonin releasing agents